Chen Hung-yen (born 1 October 1957) is a Taiwanese athlete. He competed in the men's javelin throw at the 1984 Summer Olympics.

References

1957 births
Living people
Athletes (track and field) at the 1984 Summer Olympics
Taiwanese male javelin throwers
Olympic athletes of Taiwan
Place of birth missing (living people)